Oru Mukham Pala Mukham is a 1983 Indian Malayalam-language action film directed by P. K. Joseph, starring Ratheesh, Srividya, Mohanlal, and Mammootty. Ratheesh plays Raveendran Thampi, who takes vengeance against Subhadramma Thankachi (Srividya), for killing his family and adopting him. Mohanlal plays the real son of Subhadramma Thankachi, while Mammootty plays Raveendran Thampi's real father.

Plot

Having killed a man while driving drunk, Raveendran is imprisoned and learns from his cellmate, Krishnan, that he is the son of Sankara Narayanan Thampi, a member of the Thampi family, and rightful heir to the family fortune. His adoptive mother, Subhadramma Thankachi, wrecks the Thampi family by exchanging Raveendran with her own son, Sukumaran, so that he could claim the family fortune. Raveendran gets revenge against his adopted mother, with the help of his new girlfriend, Sridevi. He plans to destroy her. Sukumaran returns as the teenage son of a rich man and heir to the wealth. Subhadramma realises her mistakes and tries to win Raveendran's forgiveness, but she is kidnapped by Rajendran and his gang. Raveendran and Sukumaran fight her enemies. Subhadramma dies trying to save her son's life, and is forgiven by Raveendran and Sukumaran for what she did.

Cast
Ratheesh as Raveendran Thampi
Srividya as Subhadramma Thankachi
Mohanlal as Sukumaran Thampi
Nellikode Bhaskaran as Krishnan
T. G. Ravi as Shekhar
Seema as Sridevi
Kuthiravattam Pappu as Rajendran
Ravi Menon as Madhavan
Santhakumari as Rajamma
Jagathy Sreekumar
Mala Aravindan
Mammootty as Sankara Narayanan Thampi
Unnimary as Sarada
Jose Prakash as Rajasekharan Thampi
 P. K. Abraham

Soundtrack
The music was composed by A. T. Ummer with lyrics by Poovachal Khader.

References

External links
 

1980s Malayalam-language films
1983 action films
1983 films
Indian action films
Films scored by A. T. Ummer